The Polish Diaspora Day is a public holiday celebrated in Poland on 2 May, to commemorate the Polish diaspora around the world. It was established on 20 March 2002, by the Sejm of Poland (lower house of the parliament), from the incitive of the Senate of Poland (upper house of the parliament). It is celebrated on the same day as the Polish National Flag Day. It takes place a day after the International Workers' Day (1 May), and a day before the 3 May Constitution Day (3 May).

Notes

References 

Public holidays in Poland
Polish diaspora